Shearson was a well-known brand in the financial services industry from 1901 through 1993, related to the following:

Companies
Shearson Hammill & Co., 1901–1974, an investment banking and brokerage firm founded by Edward Shearson
Shearson Hayden Stone, 1974–1981, formed through the merger of Shearson, Hamill and Hayden, Stone & Co.
Shearson/American Express, 1981–1984, formed through the acquisition of Shearson Hayden Stone by American Express
Shearson Lehman/American Express, 1984–1988, formed through the acquisition of Lehman Brothers Kuhn Loeb
Shearson Lehman Hutton, 1988–1990, formed through the acquisition of E.F. Hutton & Co.
Shearson Lehman Brothers, 1990–1993
Smith Barney Shearson, 1993–1994, formed through the acquisition of Shearson by Primerica in 1993 and merger with its Smith Barney unit, prior to the discontinuation of the Shearson name

People
Edward Shearson, founder of Shearson